Best of The Beach Boys Vol. 2 is the 1967 sequel to the previous year's hits package. It was compiled by Capitol Records rather hastily after Brian Wilson had announced the shelving of Smile, the album he had spent the better part of a year toiling on.

Released at a perilous moment in the Beach Boys' career, the appearance of their past glories on Best of The Beach Boys Vol. 2 perhaps helped confirm to the general public that the band was not up to the challenge of the new psychedelic music, spearheaded by albums such as The Beatles' Sgt. Pepper's Lonely Hearts Club Band, Pink Floyd's The Piper At The Gates of Dawn, Forever Changes by Love, Disraeli Gears by Cream, Surrealistic Pillow by Jefferson Airplane and The Jimi Hendrix Experience's radical debut Are You Experienced.

"I Get Around", "California Girls", "Let Him Run Wild", and "Please Let Me Wonder" were considered old hat in the face of psychedelia and as a result Best of The Beach Boys Vol. 2 initially flopped in the US, only reaching #50. The fact that Smile had been shelved two months earlier meant the group had no new material to release in time for the Summer of Love, although the music composed for that album was radical enough to have been part of it. Another commercial blunder came from their failure to appear at the Monterey International Pop Festival, which they had helped to organize and had been slated to headline as the closing act. In time the album would go on to sell over two million copies but the initial reaction must have given the Beach Boys cause for concern about their popularity and status in their homeland.

However, a reworked track list issued under the same title in the UK in late 1967 proved to be another big success.

Like its predecessor, Best of The Beach Boys Vol. 2 is out of print.

Track listing

The Duophonic version of the album features true stereo mixes of "Long Tall Texan", "Don't Worry Baby" and "Little Saint Nick".

"Please Let Me Wonder" and "Little Saint Nick" do not appear on the cassette tape version.

Best of The Beach Boys Vol. 2 (Capitol (D) 2706) hit number 50 in the US during a 22-week tenure. In the UK, it reached number 3.

British version 
The British version of Best of The Beach Boys Vol. 2 was released in mid-1967 with 14 songs, instead of the usual 12 found on American albums.

The following songs were found on the British version of Best of The Beach Boys Vol. 2:

Side A
"Surfer Girl" – 2:26
"Don't Worry Baby" – 2:51
"Wendy" – 2:22
"When I Grow Up (To Be a Man)" – 2:02
"Good to My Baby" – 2:16
"Dance, Dance, Dance" – 1:58
"Then I Kissed Her" – 2:15
Side B
"The Girl from New York City" – 1:53
"Girl Don't Tell Me" – 2:19
"The Little Girl I Once Knew" – 2:36
"Mountain of Love" – 2:47
"Here Today" – 2:52
"Wouldn't It Be Nice" – 2:22
"Good Vibrations" – 3:35

References

The Nearest Faraway Place: Brian Wilson, The Beach Boys and the Southern California Experience, Timothy White, c. 1994.
 Top Pop Singles 1955-2001, Joel Whitburn, c. 2002.
 Top Pop Albums 1955-2001, Joel Whitburn, c. 2002.
 Allmusic.com

1967 greatest hits albums
The Beach Boys compilation albums
Capitol Records compilation albums